Onychiurus is a genus of arthropods belonging to the family Onychiuridae.

The genus has cosmopolitan distribution.

Species:
 Onychiurus aborigensis Fjellberg, 1987 
 Onychiurus absoloni (Boener, 1901)

References

Collembola
Springtail genera